Streptomyces albiflavescens is a bacterium species from the genus Streptomyces which has been isolated from soil from rainforest areas in the Yunnan Province in the south west of China.

See also 
 List of Streptomyces species

References 

albiflavescens
Bacteria described in 2015